West-Brabant Giants was a Dutch professional basketball club based in Bergen op Zoom. The club was established in 2003 and dissolved in 2011. The team played its games at Sporthal de Boulevard and its main colors were red and white.

History
The club was established in 2003 and was called Fun 4 All, for sponsorship reasons. The club entered the Dutch Basketball League, and ended 10th in the regular season. The next season the club was named the Myleasecar Giants, and the team reached the play-offs for the first time in its history. From 2005 till 2007 the club had the name Polynorm Giants, in these seasons the Giants made the postseason once. In 2008 and 2009 the Giants were semi-finalist in the play-offs. In 2010 the club had its best season, under the name World Class Aviation Academy Giants the team reached the Dutch finals. In the best-of-seven play-off series the Giants lost 4-1 to the GasTerra Flames from Groningen. After a season in which the Giants were quarterfinalists, the club was dissolved on 9 September 2011 due to financial problems.

Players

Notable players

Head coaches
 Otis Loyd (2003–2004)
 Tony van den Bosch (2004–2007)
 Erik Braal (2007–2011)

Season by season

References

Defunct basketball teams in the Netherlands
Former Dutch Basketball League teams
2003 establishments in the Netherlands
2011 disestablishments in the Netherlands
Basketball teams established in 2003
Basketball teams disestablished in 2011
Sports clubs in North Brabant
Sport in Bergen op Zoom